Bathyctenidae is a family of ctenophores belonging to the order Cydippida. The family consists of only one genus: Bathyctena Mortensen, 1932.

References

Tentaculata